Jackson County is a county located in the U.S. state of Ohio. As of the 2020 census, the population was 32,653. Its county seat is Jackson. The county is named for Andrew Jackson, a hero of the War of 1812 who was subsequently elected President of the United States. It is known as "The Little Wales of Ohio." Jackson County comprises the Jackson, OH Micropolitan Statistical Area.

History
Jackson County is north of the Ohio River in eastern Ohio, an area that was long occupied by various tribes of Native Americans. Evidence of this era in the Ohio Valley is found in the area's large burial and ceremonial mounds and petroglyphs including the Leo Petroglyph.

Tribes that inhabited the area in the Colonial period included with Mingo, Lenape, and Shawnee. Westward expansion by American pioneers displaced the Indigenous People who were killed in wars or relocated to the Great Plains and placed on reservations following the passage of the Indian Removal Act. The pioneer settlers cleared the land for farming and developed industries around which towns and cities grew.

Iron ore was discovered in southern Ohio in the mid-19th century. The combination of deposits of ore and vast stands of old-growth forests made the Hanging Rock Iron Region ideally suited for the iron industry. The Jefferson Iron Furnace was constructed in 1854. It met the growing demand for iron in the developing United States of America. The importance of the furnaces in the Hanging Rock region grew tremendously during the American Civil War. Iron produced in Jackson County was sold to manufacturers under the trademark, "Anchor". This iron was used to build the USS Monitor, an ironclad warship made famous by its contest against the CSS Virginia, a Confederate ironclad sometimes known as the Merrimack, at the Battle of Hampton Roads.

The era of iron production in Jackson County began to wane in the years following the Civil War. Demand for iron outstripped the resources in the Hanging Rock Iron Region. Ore deposits had been cleared and what remained was minimal and difficult to extract. Also much of the forested land had been cleared to provide charcoal to fire the furnaces. A combination of a lack of ore and charcoal helped bring about the end of the iron era. Remnants of the Jefferson Iron Furnaces are found in Jackson Lake State Park.

Other industries that were in the area included coal mining and salt mining. Over a million tons of coal were mined in 1888. Jackson County was the second leading coal producing county in the state during the coal mining era. Salt mines along Salt Creek were set aside "by Congress for the use of the state to secure the salt." Indian tribes also used the area and came from great distances to gather salt.

Geography

Adjacent counties
 Vinton County (north)
 Gallia County (east)
 Lawrence County (south)
 Scioto County (southwest)
 Pike County (west)
 Ross County (northwest)

National protected areas
 Wayne National Forest (part)
 Liberty Wildlife Area

Demographics

2000 census
As of the census of 2000, there were 32,641 people, 12,619 households, and 9,136 families living in the county. The population density was 78 people per square mile (30/km2). There were 13,909 housing units at an average density of 33 per square mile (13/km2). The racial makeup of the county was 97.89% White, 0.59% Black or African American, 0.34% Native American, 0.17% Asian, 0.02% Pacific Islander, 0.16% from other races, and 0.82% from two or more races. 0.60% of the population were Hispanic or Latino of any race. In 2010 16.5% were of German, 12.9% American, 11.3% Irish, 10.4% English, 5.2% Welsh, 2.4% Scottish, and 1.6% Ulster Scot.

There were 12,619 households, out of which 34.5% had children under the age of 18 living with them, 55.4% were married couples living together, 12.0% had a female householder with no husband present, and 27.6% were non-families. 24.0% of all households were made up of individuals, and 10.5% had someone living alone who was 65 years of age or older. The average household size was 2.55 and the average family size was 3.00.

In the county, the population was spread out, with 26.0% under the age of 18, 8.7% from 18 to 24, 28.7% from 25 to 44, 23.0% from 45 to 64, and 13.6% who were 65 years of age or older. The median age was 36 years. For every 100 females there were 93.2 males. For every 100 females age 18 and over, there were 89.9 males.

The median income for a household in the county was $30,661, and the median income for a family was $36,022. Males had a median income of $30,651 versus $21,546 for females. The per capita income for the county was $14,789. About 13.6% of families and 16.5% of the population were below the poverty line, including 20.3% of those under age 18 and 16.1% of those age 65 or over.

2010 census
As of the 2010 United States Census, there were 33,225 people, 13,010 households, and 9,028 families living in the county. The racial makeup of the county was 97.1% white, 0.6% black or African American, 0.4% American Indian, 0.3% Asian, 0.2% from other races, and 1.4% from two or more races. Those of Hispanic or Latino origin made up 0.8% of the population. In terms of ancestry, 16.1% were German, 12.3% were American, 11.6% were Irish, 10.6% were English and 4.4% were Welsh.

Of the 13,010 households, 33.9% had children under the age of 18 living with them, 50.9% were married couples living together, 12.7% had a female householder with no husband present, 30.6% were non-families, and 25.9% of all households were made up of individuals. The average household size was 2.53 and the average family size was 3.01. The median age was 39.0 years.

The median income for a household in the county was $34,044 and the median income for a family was $42,560. Males had a median income of $36,910 versus $28,618 for females. The per capita income for the county was $18,775. About 18.1% of families and 23.3% of the population were below the poverty line, including 36.5% of those under age 18 and 11.5% of those age 65 or over.

Politics
Jackson County typically leans Republican in presidential elections.

|}

Government
Jackson County has a three-member Board of County Commissioners that administers and oversees the various County departments, similar to all but two of the 88 Ohio counties.

Jackson County's elected officials are:
 County Commissioners: Ed Armstrong (R), Jon Hensler (R), and Paul Haller (R)
 County Auditor: Tiffany Ridgeway (R)
 Clerk Of Courts: Seth Michael (R)
 Common Pleas Court: Judge Christopher Regan (R)
 County Coroner: Dr. Alice Frazier (R)
 County Engineer: Melissa Miller, P.E., P.S. (R)
 Juvenile Court: Judge Justin W. Skaggs (D)
 Municipal Court: Judge Mark T. Musick (D)
 Probate Court: Judge Justin W. Skaggs (D)
 Prosecuting Attorney: Justin Lovett (R)
 County Recorder: Rose Cherrington Walters (R)
 County Sheriff: Tedd Frazier (R)
 County Treasurer: B. Lee Hubbard, CPA (R)

Communities

Cities
 Jackson (county seat)
 Wellston

Villages
 Coalton
 Oak Hill

Townships

 Bloomfield
 Coal
 Franklin
 Hamilton
 Jackson
 Jefferson
 Liberty
 Lick
 Madison
 Milton
 Scioto
 Washington

https://web.archive.org/web/20160715023447/http://www.ohiotownships.org/township-websites

Unincorporated communities

 Altoona
 Banner
 Big Rock
 Blackfork Junction
 Brocks Corner
 Buckeye
 Buffalo
 Byer
 Camba
 Chapman
 Clay
 Comet
 Davisville
 Englishville
 Four Mile
 Garfield
 Glade
 Glen Nell
 Glen Roy
 Goldsboro
 Horeb
 Ironton Junction
 Jackson Heights
 Jonestown
 Keystone
 Kitchen
 Leo
 Lesmil
 Limerick
 Mabee Corner
 Monroe
 Mulga
 Oakland
 Orpheus
 Pattonsville
 Petersburg
 Petrea
 Pyro
 Ratchford
 Rempel
 Roads
 Rocky Hill
 Savageville
 Tom Corwin
 Wainwright
 Winchester
 Vega

See also
 Jackson County Apple Festival
 Leo Petroglyph
 National Register of Historic Places listings in Jackson County, Ohio

References

External links
 County website
 Jackson Area Chamber of Commerce
 Jackson County Emergency Management Agency
 Jackson County Geographic Information System
 Jackson County Sheriff's Office
 History of Jackson County, Ohio
 Buckeye Furnace - reconstructed charcoal-fired iron blast furnace with original stack

 
Appalachian Ohio
Counties of Appalachia
1816 establishments in Ohio
Populated places established in 1816
Welsh-American culture in Ohio
Welsh diaspora